Schiller Park School District 81 is a school district headquartered in Schiller Park, Illinois.

In addition to Schiller Park its territory includes a section of Franklin Park.

It has three schools, all in Schiller Park: Kennedy Elementary, Washington Elementary, and Lincoln Middle School.

References

External links
 

School districts in Cook County, Illinois